Gambierdiscus carolinianus is a species of toxic dinoflagellate, which among others causes ciguatera fish poisoning. It is photosynthetic and epibenthic.

References

Further reading
Kibler, Steven R., et al. "Growth of eight Gambierdiscus (Dinophyceae) species: Effects of temperature, salinity and irradiance." Harmful Algae 19 (2012): 1-14.
Vandersea, Mark W., et al. "Development of semi‐quantitative pcr assays for the detection and enumeration of gambierdiscus species (gonyaulacales, dinophyceae) 1." Journal of phycology 48.4 (2012): 902-915.

External links
AlgaeBase

Gonyaulacales
Protists described in 2009